International Society for Universal Dialogue is a philosophical society whose purpose is to promote discussions of human rights, world peace, and preservation of the environment.

External links

References 

International organisations based in Poland
Philosophical societies
International learned societies